Pieter Coenraad Strydom (born 10 June 1969) is a former cricketer. He played two Test matches and ten One Day Internationals for South Africa in 2000 until he was caught up in the South Africa cricket match fixing, but he was acquitted of those charges.

In February 2020, he was named in South Africa's squad for the Over-50s Cricket World Cup in South Africa. However, the tournament was cancelled during the third round of matches due to the coronavirus pandemic.

References

External links

1969 births
Living people
People from Somerset East
South African cricketers
South Africa Test cricketers
South Africa One Day International cricketers
Border cricketers
Eastern Province cricketers
Huntingdonshire cricketers
Warriors cricketers
Alumni of Grey High School
Cricketers from the Eastern Cape